Operation Hammer may refer to:

Operation Hammer (1969), Australian military operation during the Vietnam War fought around the village of Binh Ba, 6–8 June 1969
Operation Hammer (1987), a Los Angeles Police Department CRASH initiative that began in April 1987
Operation Hammer (1997), a Turkish Armed Forces operation in northern Iraq against the Kurdistan Workers Party
Operation Hammer (Afghanistan), a 2007 Coalition operation during the War in Afghanistan (2001–2021)

See also

 Hammer and anvil, military tactic
 Operation Tiger Hammer, 2003 US-Iraq War military operation
 Operation Viking Hammer, 2003 US-Iraq War military operation
 Operation Sledgehammer Hit, 2007 NATO-Afghanistan War military operation
 Operation Hammer Down, 2011 NATO-Afgahnistan War military operation
 Gulf War: Operation Desert Hammer, 1999 videogame
 
 Operation Iron Hammer (disambiguation)
 Hammer (disambiguation)
 Operation (disambiguation)
 Warhammer (disambiguation)